MS-10 or variation, may refer to:

Soyuz MS-10, was an aborted 2018 launch of the Soyuz spacecraft, the spacecraft, and the mission
Progress MS-10, a Russian spacecraft, and unmanned space resupply mission
Korg MS-10, an analog synthesizer
Matra MS10, a Formula One car
MiniSonic MS10, a professional audio test equipment from Lindos Electronics
Mississippi Highway 10 (MS 10)

See also 

 Manuscript 10 (MS 10), several manuscripts; see List of illuminated manuscripts
 
 
 
 
 MS1 (disambiguation)
 MS (disambiguation)
 10 (disambiguation)